Zabrus ovipennis is a species of ground beetle in the Pelor subgenus. It was described by Maximilien Chaudoir in 1844 and is endemic to Iran.

References

Beetles described in 1844
Beetles of Asia
Endemic fauna of Iran
Zabrus